Norman Luboff (May 14, 1917 – September 22, 1987) was an American music arranger, music publisher, and choir director.

Early years
Norman Luboff was born in Chicago, Illinois in 1917.  He studied piano as a child and participated in his high school chorus. Luboff studied at the University of Chicago and Central College in Chicago. Following this, he did graduate work with the composer Leo Sowerby while singing and writing for radio programs in Chicago. Luboff served in the U.S. Army's Signal Corps.

Radio, TV and film 
With a call from Hollywood to be choral director of The Railroad Hour, a radio weekly starring Gordon MacRae, Luboff began a successful career scoring many television programs and more than 80 motion pictures. He also recorded with artists such as Bing Crosby, Frank Sinatra, Jo Stafford, Frankie Laine and Doris Day.

Publishing company
In 1950, he established Walton Music Corporation, to publish his music. Luboff provided a vehicle for composers in Sweden to have their works available in the United States, including Waldemar Åhlén, and Egil Hovland from Norway. Walton Music exists today as a major choral music publisher under the guidance of Luboff's widow, Gunilla Marcus-Luboff, a former Swedish television producer.

Norman Luboff Choir
Luboff was the founder and conductor of the Norman Luboff Choir, one of the leading choral groups of the 1950s, 60s and 70s. They came to prominence through their participation in the very successful Christmas broadcasts with Bing Crosby which ran from 1955 to 1962. History was made in 1956 when Luboff and his choir recorded with Harry Belafonte on "Calypso", the first album to sell one million copies. The choral group toured yearly from 1963 to 1987, and recorded more than 75 albums. The holiday albums Songs of Christmas (1956) and Christmas with the Norman Luboff Choir (1964) were perennial bestsellers for years. Luboff and his choir won the 1961 Grammy Award for Best Performance by a Chorus.

Luboff was also a guest conductor at many choirs in the United States and abroad.

His choir’s version of Dixie was used on numerous tv & radio station sign-on & sign-offs in Southern USA including WRAL-TV, WBBR, WQOK, & WALT.

Death
Norman Luboff died of lung cancer at his home in Bynum, North Carolina in 1987 at the age of 70. The Norman Luboff Collection was donated to the Music Division of the United States Library of Congress in 1993 by his widow.

References

External links

Walton Music website

1917 births
1987 deaths
American male composers
American choral conductors
American male conductors (music)
American music arrangers
Musicians from Chicago
Grammy Award winners
RCA Victor artists
Deaths from lung cancer in North Carolina
20th-century American conductors (music)
20th-century American composers
Classical musicians from Illinois
20th-century American male musicians